Michael John Gallagher (born March 3, 1984) is an American politician serving as the U.S. representative for  since 2017. His district covers the state's northeastern part. Gallagher succeeded Representative Reid Ribble after the 2016 election. His service in Congress has been notable for contributions in national security.

Early years 
Gallagher lived in Green Bay through middle school. After his parents' divorce, he moved to California and studied at Mater Dei High School in Santa Ana, while spending summers in Wisconsin. Gallagher later said his teachers "endowed me with a love for history and set me on a path to earning a Ph.D. with a focus on Cold War history." He graduated in 2002 as a valedictorian.

Military

Gallagher was a United States Marine Corps intelligence officer, serving seven years (2006–13) on active duty. He twice deployed to the Al Anbar Province, Iraq, serving on General David Petraeus's CENTCOM Assessment Team as a commander of intelligence teams. He assessed American military strategy in the Middle East and Central Asia in his role as a counterintelligence officer, and as a member of the CENTCOM assessment team.

Education
Gallagher earned his B.A. in 2006 from the Woodrow Wilson School of Public and International Affairs at Princeton University. With a growing interest in global security, he changed his major from Spanish to Arabic. Gallagher completed a 117-page long senior thesis, "New Approaches to Asymmetric Threats in the Middle East: From Fighting to Winning", under the supervision of Frederick Hitz. At this time he completed a summer internship abroad with the Rand Corporation in Cambridge, United Kingdom, working on a strategic study of terrorist groups such as Basque separatists.

Having served on his first tour of duty in Iraq with the United States Marine Corps, Gallagher began a MSSI (Master of Science in Strategic Intelligence) at National Intelligence University, graduating in 2010.

Gallagher completed a second M.A, in security studies, in 2012 and a third, in government, in 2013, both from Georgetown University. He then began doctoral studies, writing a dissertation on the administrations of Harry S. Truman and Dwight D. Eisenhower and the Cold War, receiving his Ph.D. in government and international relations in 2015.

U.S. House of Representatives

Elections 
Gallagher served as a Republican staffer on the United States Senate Committee on Foreign Relations. Governor of Wisconsin Scott Walker hired him as a foreign policy advisor in February 2015, in preparation for his 2016 presidential campaign.

After Walker dropped out of the presidential race, Gallagher worked as a senior marketing strategist for Breakthrough Fuel, a supply-chain management company. He then ran for Wisconsin's 8th congressional district seat, to which Reid Ribble was not seeking reelection. Gallagher won the primary against Wisconsin state senator Frank Lasee and Forestville village president Terry McNulty.

In the general election, Gallagher defeated Outagamie County Executive Tom Nelson, 63% to 36%. He was reelected in 2018 over Brown County assistant district attorney Beau Liegeois.

Tenure 

Gallagher voted in line with President Donald Trump's position 93.8% of the time in the 115th Congress and 84.2% of the time in the 116th Congress, but broke with the White House on issues such as the Trump's firing of FBI Director James Comey and Trump's denial of Russian interference in the 2016 elections. He voted against the majority of his party about 8.7% of the time.

In 2018, Gallagher argued that power in the House of Representatives was too concentrated in the leadership; he proposed allowing committee members to choose their own chairs and ranking members, rather than having these positions be selected by the parties' steering committees. This proposal was rejected in a House Republican vote. Gallagher also argued for consolidating the appropriating and authorizing House committees and a reform of the House calendar that would have the chamber sit "at least five days a week for three consecutive weeks, then spend a full week back in their districts" (a change from the current congressional practice of very short legislative workweeks and frequent long weekends allowing members more time in their districts). His unsuccessful reform proposals were praised by Norm Ornstein, a scholar of Congress, as "constructive" although unlikely to be adopted.

Gallagher has been identified as a leading voice on matters of national security, and chairs the House Select Committee on the Chinese Communist Party in the 118th United States Congress.

Health care and public health
Gallagher voted for the 2017 Republican bill to repeal the Affordable Care Act (ACA). In 2017, he called the ACA "unsustainable". In 2018, Gallagher voted to expand eligibility for health savings accounts; in 2019, he voted against a proposal to allow the federal government to negotiate lower prices for prescription drugs.

During the COVID-19 pandemic in Wisconsin, Gallagher's district had some of the nation's highest infection rates. He did not take a position on the Wisconsin state legislature's lawsuit seeking to invalidate Governor Tony Evers's directive to mandate the wearing of masks in public as a way to combat the transmission of the virus.

Foreign affairs
In a 2016 profile in the Green Bay Press Gazette, Gallagher blamed President Barack Obama and former Secretary of State Hillary Clinton for the success of ISIS in Iraq. In 2019, he wrote it would be "a smart geopolitical move" for the U.S. to buy Greenland, a notion that Trump floated. In 2020, Gallagher voted against a measure to block Trump from taking military action against Iran without Congress's consent. In 2017, he supported a U.S. airstrike in Syria in retaliation for the Khan Shaykhun chemical attack, and in 2020 he supported the U.S. drone strike that targeted Iranian general Qasem Soleimani. In 2019, Gallagher voted for a measure opposing Trump's decision to withdraw U.S. forces from Syria.

In 2019, after American video game company Activision Blizzard punished a Hong Kong-based professional gamer for supporting pro-democracy Hong Kong protests, Gallagher accused Blizzard of censorship. He co-signed a letter to Activision Blizzard CEO Bobby Kotick that read, "As China amplifies its campaign of intimidation, you and your company must decide whether to look beyond the bottom line and promote American values—like freedom of speech and thought—or to give in to Beijing’s demands in order to preserve market access."

In 2020, Gallagher and Senator Tom Cotton drafted a bill banning federal agencies, such as the departments of the Health and Human Services, Veterans Affairs, and Defense, from purchasing drugs manufactured in China.

In June 2021, Gallagher was one of 49 House Republicans to vote to repeal the AUMF (Authorization for Use of Military Force) against Iraq.

During the Russo-Ukrainian War, Gallagher signed a letter advocating for President Biden to give F-16 fighter jets to Ukraine.

Economy
In 2017, Gallagher voted to dismantle the Dodd-Frank financial regulations. In 2019, he voted against increasing the federal minimum wage to $15 an hour. He voted in favor of the 2017 Tax Cuts and Jobs Act. He voted to repeal a federal regulation barring some companies in the financial sector from including mandatory arbitration clauses in contracts. He supported the 2018 farm bill.

Gallagher has supported bipartisan proposals to use industrial policy to counter Chinese economic power; in 2020, he joined Democrats in favor of a proposal to grant $10 billion "to establish regional tech hubs that would aim to create new companies and boost manufacturing." Gallagher has sponsored legislation to bar federal agencies from purchasing Chinese-manufactured drones. In December 2022, he co-sponsored a bill with Marco Rubio to prohibit Chinese and Russian-owned social networking services from conducting business transactions in the U.S. under security grounds.

Energy and environment
In 2019, Gallagher voted against a resolution to block Trump from withdrawing the U.S. from the Paris Agreement on climate change. He voted for a measure to ban drilling in the eastern Gulf of Mexico, but against a measure to ban drilling off the Atlantic and Pacific coasts. He voted for a measure opposing a carbon tax, and for a delay in ozone protection regulations. In 2017, he voted to repeal the Stream Protection Rule and to repeal federal regulations to require energy companies to reduce emissions and waste and to disclose payments made to foreign governments. The League of Conservation Voters gave Gallagher a lifetime score of 5%.

Social issues
Gallagher has voted for various anti-abortion measures. He voted against a 2019 measure opposing a ban on openly transgender people serving in the U.S. military. He voted for the 2018 First Step Act. Gallagher voted for the Respect for Marriage Act on December 8, 2022.

Other issues
Gallagher voted against the impeachment inquiry against Donald Trump, and later voted against adopting two articles of impeachment against Trump, on charges of obstruction of Congress and abuse of power.

In 2018, Gallagher voted against a House resolution condemning Trump for his comments attacking four Democratic congresswomen and saying that they should "go back and help fix the totally broken and crime infested places from which they came". He declined to call Trump's comments racist, but earlier rebuked Trump supporters for "send her back" chants. Gallagher spoke at a Trump rally in Wisconsin in 2019.

Gallagher voted against restoring part of the Voting Rights Act. He voted against a 2020 bill for District of Columbia statehood. In 2018, he voted to reauthorize the warrantless surveillance program as part of the Foreign Intelligence Surveillance Act. 
 
In May 2018, after a meeting at the White House, Trump endorsed Gallagher's proposal for congressional term limits; the proposal also received support from Brian Fitzpatrick, Jodey Arrington, and Vicente González. Gallagher's plan consists of limiting senators to two terms and representatives to six terms (12 years each). It would be grandfathered in order not to apply to sitting members of Congress, except the so-called "freshman class".

On January 6, 2021, Gallagher was one of seven Republicans who did not support their colleagues' efforts to challenge the results of the 2020 presidential election. These seven signed a letter that, while giving credence to election fraud allegations made by Trump, said Congress did not have the authority to influence the election's outcome.

During the 2021 storming of the United States Capitol, Gallagher said, "We are witnessing absolute banana republic crap in the United States Capitol right now", and told Trump, "you need to call this off". In May 2021, Gallagher and 174 other House Republicans voted against creating a commission to investigate the storming. He attributed his opposition to a desire to have non-public investigations and wanting "key language preventing interference in the over 400 ongoing criminal prosecutions".

On January 9, 2021, Gallagher joined a group of other Republican legislators led by Ken Buck of Colorado in signing a letter to President-elect Joe Biden, asking him to formally request that House Speaker Nancy Pelosi halt efforts to impeach Trump.

Committee assignments 
Committee on Armed Services
Committee on Transportation and Infrastructure
Committee on the Chinese Communist Party

Caucus memberships 
 Republican Governance Group  
Republican Study Committee
Republican Main Street Partnership
Climate Solutions Caucus
U.S.-Japan Caucus
Problem Solvers Caucus

Personal life 
Gallagher married Broadway actress Anne Horak in September 2019. Their daughter was born in June 2020.

Electoral history

2016

2018

2022

References

External links
Congressman Mike Gallagher official U.S. House website
Mike Gallagher for Congress

|-

|-

1984 births
21st-century American politicians
Living people
Military personnel from Wisconsin
National Intelligence University alumni
Politicians from Green Bay, Wisconsin
Princeton School of Public and International Affairs alumni
Republican Party members of the United States House of Representatives from Wisconsin
Walsh School of Foreign Service alumni
United States Marine Corps reservists